C.A. Rosetti is a commune in Buzău County, Muntenia, Romania. It is composed of six villages: Bălteni, Bâlhacu, C.A. Rosetti, Cotu Ciorii, Lunca and Vizireni.

The commune was named after the liberal Wallachian politician Constantin Alexandru Rosetti, who used to own an estate in the commune.

C.A. Rosetti commune is located in the eastern part of the county, on the border with Brăila County,  from the county seat, Buzău.

Notes

Communes in Buzău County
Localities in Muntenia